Plymouth Argyle Football Club are an English professional association football club based in Plymouth, Devon. They compete in the Football League One, the third division of the English football league system. The club was formed in 1886 as Argyle Football Club, a name which was retained until 1903 when the club became professional and were elected to the Southern Football League. The club also entered English football's premier knockout competition, the Football Association Challenge Cup, for the first time that same year. The club joined the Football League in 1920, and have competed there since then, achieving multiple league titles, promotions, and relegations.

This list encompasses the major honours won by Plymouth Argyle, records set by the club, their managers and their players. The player records section includes details of the club's leading goalscorers and those who have made most appearances in first-team competitions. It also records notable achievements by Plymouth Argyle players on the international stage, and the highest transfer fees paid and received by the club. Attendance records at Home Park, the club's ground since 1901, are also included in the list.

Honours
Plymouth Argyle have won multiple titles in domestic competition. They have won the third tier of English football four times, which is a record. In their second season as a professional club they won their first title, the Western League, in 1905. The club's most recent title came in 2004 when they won the Football League Second Division.

Domestic

League
 Football League Second Division
 Winners (1): 2003–04

 Football League Third Division
 Winners (2): 1958–59, 2001–02
 Runners-up (2): 1974–75, 1985–86

 Football League Third Division South
 Winners (2): 1929–30, 1951–52
 Runners-up (6): 1921–22, 1922–23, 1923–24, 1924–25, 1925–26, 1926–27

 Southern Football League
 Winners (1): 1912–13
 Runners-up (2): 1907–08, 1911–12

 Western Football League
 Winners (1): 1904–05
 Runners-up (1): 1906–07

Cups
 Football League Third Division Play-offs
 Winners (1): 1996

Player records

Appearances
Plymouth Argyle's appearance record is held by Kevin Hodges, who played 620 times for the club over the course of 15 seasons from 1978 to 1992. Hodges also holds the records for appearances made in league, FA Cup, and League Cup competition. The player to have made the most appearances in the current squad is Luke McCormick, with 350 (including 4 as a substitute) as at 19 February 2022.

 Most appearances in all competitions: Kevin Hodges, 620.
 Most League appearances: Kevin Hodges, 530.
 Most FA Cup appearances: Kevin Hodges, 39.
 Most League Cup appearances: Kevin Hodges, 35.
 Youngest first-team player: Freddie Issaka, 15 years and 34 days (against Newport County, 31 August 2021).
 Oldest first-team player: Peter Shilton, 44 years and 21 days (against Burnley, 9 October 1993).
 Oldest debutant: Peter Shilton, 42 years and 199 days (against Charlton Athletic, 4 April 1992).
 Longest-serving player: Kevin Hodges, 14 years and 71 days (from 1978 to 1992).

Most appearances
Competitive, professional matches only, appearances as substitute in brackets. Bold indicates still playing at the club.

Goalscorers
Plymouth Argyle's all-time leading goalscorer is Sammy Black, who scored 184 goals for the club over the course of 14 seasons from 1924 to 1938. Black also holds the record for goals scored in league competition. The records for goals scored in FA Cup and League Cup competition are held by Wilf Carter, and Sean McCarthy respectively.

 Most goals in all competitions: Sammy Black, 184.
 Most league goals: Sammy Black, 176.
 Most FA Cup goals: Wilf Carter, 10.
 Most League Cup goals: Sean McCarthy, 8.
 Most goals in a season: Jack Cock, 32 (during the 1926–27 season).
 Most goals in one match: Wilf Carter, 5.
 Most hat-tricks in a season: Frank Richardson (1921–22), Jack Cock (1926–27), Wilf Carter (1957–58), 3.
 Most hat-tricks: Wilf Carter, 8.
 Highest-scoring substitute: Mickey Evans, 9.
 Most games without scoring for an outfield player: Jimmy Rae, 258.
 Fastest goal scored: Nick Chadwick (against Crystal Palace, 17 December 2005) and Onismor Bhasera (against AFC Wimbledon, 7 March 2012), 11 seconds.

Top goalscorers
Competitive, professional matches only. Matches played (including as substitute) appear in brackets.

International
 First capped player: Richard Morris, for Wales on 11 March 1908.
 Most international caps while a Plymouth Argyle player: Tony Capaldi, 21 for Northern Ireland.
 Most international goals while a Plymouth Argyle player: Carlo Corazzin, for Canada and Rory Fallon for New Zealand, 2.
 First Plymouth Argyle player to appear at a World Cup: George Baker for Wales, at 1958 FIFA World Cup.
 Most World Cup appearances by a former Plymouth Argyle player: Paul Mariner, 5 for England in 1982.
 Most World Cup goals by a former Plymouth Argyle player: Paul Mariner, 1 for England in 1982.

Transfers

Record transfer fees paid

Record transfer fees received

Managerial records

 First manager: Frank Brettell, from 1 August 1903 to 31 May 1905.
 Longest-serving manager by time: Bob Jack, two spells, from 1 August 1905 to 31 May 1906, and 1 August 1910 to 1 April 1938.
 Longest-serving manager by matches: Bob Jack, managed the club for 1,093 matches over a period that spanned 28 years.

Club records

Matches

Firsts
 First match: Argyle Football Club 0–2 Caxton, a friendly match, 16 October 1886.
 First Western League match: West Ham United 0–1 Plymouth Argyle, 1 September 1903.
 First Southern League match: Plymouth Argyle 2–0 Northampton Town, 5 September 1903.
 First FA Cup match: Plymouth Argyle 7–0 Whiteheads, first qualifying round 31 October 1903.
 First Football League match: Plymouth Argyle 1–1 Norwich City, Third Division, 28 August 1920.
 First League Cup match: Plymouth Argyle 2–0 Southport, first round, 12 October 1960.

Wins
 Record win: 8–1 against Millwall in Second Division, 16 January 1932, and Hartlepool United in Second Division, 7 May 1994.
 Record FA Cup win: 6–0 against Corby Town, third round, 22 January 1966.
 Record League Cup win: 4–0 against Portsmouth, second round, 9 October 1973.
 Most league wins in a season: 31 wins out of 46 games (during the 2001–02 season).
 Fewest league wins in a season: 8 wins out of 42 games (during the 1949–50, 1963–64, 1976–77 seasons).

Defeats
 Record defeat: 0–9 against Stoke City in Second Division, 17 December 1960.
 Record FA Cup defeat: 1–7 against Tottenham Hotspur, first round replay, 19 January 1910.
 Record League Cup defeat: 0–6 against West Ham United, second round, 26 September 1962.
 Most league defeats in a season: 31 defeats out of 42 games (during the 1945–46 season).
 Fewest league defeats in a season: 4 defeats out of 42 games (during th a season: 35 in 42 games (during the 1920–21 season, Third Division).

 Most league goals conceded in a season: 120 in 42 games (during the 1945–46 season, Football League South).
 Fewest league goals conceded in a season: 24 in 42 games (during the 1921–22 season, Third Division South).

Points
 Most points in a season (two for a win): 68 in 42 games (during the 1929–30 season, Third Division South).
 Fewest points in a season (two for a win): 27 in 42 games (during the 1967–68 season, Second Division).
 Most points in a season (three for a win): 102 in 46 games (during the 2001–02 season, Third Division).
 Fewest points in a season (three for a win): 46 in 46 games (during the 1994–95 season, Second Division).

Attendances
 Record highest attendance: 43,596 (against Aston Villa, Second Division, 10 October 1936).
 Highest FA Cup attendance: 43,426 (against Huddersfield Town, third round, 13 January 1934).
 Highest League Cup attendance: 30,390 (against Manchester City, semi-final, 23 January 1974).
 Record lowest attendance: 944 (against AFC Bournemouth, EFL Trophy, 10 December 1996).
 Lowest FA Cup attendance: 1,870 (against Whiteheads, first qualifying round, 31 October 1903).
 Lowest League Cup attendance: 1,834 (against Walsall, first round, 24 August 1999).
 Record highest attendance at a neutral venue: 57,956 at Wembley (against Wimbledon, Second Division Play-off Final, 30 May 2016).
 Record highest attendance on the road: 65,386 at Highbury (against Arsenal, FA Cup fourth round, 23 January 1932).

Footnotes
A.  Appearances made in the abandoned 1939–40 season and subsequent wartime competitions are unofficial and therefore excluded.

B.  Appearances and goals in the EFL Trophy, Full Members Cup, Watney Cup, Anglo-Scottish Cup, and Football League Group Cup.

References
General

Specific

Records and Statistics
Plymouth Argyle F.C.